HL Tauri (abbreviated HL Tau) is a very young T Tauri star in the constellation Taurus, approximately  from Earth in the Taurus Molecular Cloud. The luminosity and effective temperature of  imply that its age is less than 100,000 years. At apparent magnitude 15.1, it is too faint to be seen with the unaided eye. It is surrounded by a protoplanetary disk marked by dark bands visible in submillimeter radiation that may indicate a number of planets in the process of formation. It is accompanied by the Herbig–Haro object , a jet of gas emitted along the rotational axis of the disk that is colliding with nearby interstellar dust and gas.

Protoplanetary disk
Indications of a protoplanetary disk were first presented in 1975 with infrared spectral observations in wavelengths between 2 and 4 microns, which were made possible by the recent invention of the indium antimonide photovoltaic detector. Of 29 very young stars examined, only  showed a strong absorption feature centered on the expected 3.07 micron absorption of ice particles, which authors attributed to the ν1, ν3, and 2ν2 vibrational frequencies of the O–H bond. A 1982 survey identified  as one of the most highly polarized  stars known, along with DG Tauri and V536 Aquilae.

A gas disk was discovered by interferometric observation of carbon monoxide (CO) emissions in 1986. The temperature of the gas and grains of the disk are probably of the order of a few tens of kelvins. Bipolar outflow of molecules such as carbon monoxide (CO) and  diatomic hydrogen (H2) have been observed. The element iron has also been noted in the outflow in its Fe(II) oxidation state, also called Fe2+ or ferrous iron.

An image of the protoplanetary disk made at submillimeter wavelengths by the Atacama Large Millimeter/submillimeter Array (ALMA) was made public in 2014, showing a series of concentric bright rings separated by gaps. The disk appeared much more evolved than would have been expected from the age of the system, which suggests that the planetary formation process may be faster than previously thought. ALMA's Catherine Vlahakis said, "When we first saw this image we were astounded at the spectacular level of detail. HL Tauri is no more than a million years old, yet already its disc appears to be full of forming planets. This one image alone will revolutionize theories of planet formation."

Stephens et al. (2014) suggest that the faster accretion rate might be due to the complex magnetic field of the protoplanetary disk.

Gallery

References

External links

K-type stars
Tauri, HL
T Tauri stars
Taurus (constellation)